Green Clay Smith (July 4, 1826 – June 29, 1895) was a United States soldier and politician. Elected to the Kentucky state house before the American Civil War, he was commissioned as a Union officer when he volunteered, advancing to the rank of brigadier general before he resigned to go to Congress. He was promoted to Major General by brevet on March 13, 1865. He was elected to the US Congress from Kentucky in 1862, representing the Unionist Party and serving until 1866.

That year, Smith was appointed as the Territorial Governor of Montana, serving from 1866 to 1869. He returned to Washington, D.C.,  where he was ordained as a Baptist minister and became active in the temperance movement.

Biography
Smith was born in 1826 in Richmond, Kentucky to John Speed Smith and his wife Elizabeth Lewis (Clay) Smith (1798-1887) as the third of seven children. He was named for his maternal grandfather, Green Clay, a very wealthy planter and slaveholder in Kentucky and a prominent politician. His siblings included Sally Ann Lewis (1818-1875), named for her maternal grandmother; Curran Cassius, Pauline Green, Junius Brutus (never married), Mary Spencer (never married), and John Speed, Jr.

Smith's father was elected to the Kentucky legislature and the U.S. House of Representatives. His mother's younger brothers, Brutus J. Clay and Cassius M. Clay, both became state politicians and were later elected as members of the Unionist Party to the US Congress from Kentucky during the American Civil War. Cassius became known as an abolitionist before the war.

As a young man, Green Clay Smith pursued academic studies. When the U.S.-Mexican War began, he enlisted in the Army and was commissioned as a second lieutenant in the First Regiment of the Kentucky Volunteer Infantry on June 9, 1846.

Smith returned to Kentucky, where he graduated from Transylvania University in 1849, then studied law and was admitted to the bar in 1852. He began his practice in Covington. From 1853 to 1857, Smith served as a school commissioner.

Career

Congressman
Smith was elected as a member of the Kentucky House of Representatives, serving from 1861 to 1863. On April 4, 1862, he was commissioned colonel of the Fourth Regiment of the Kentucky Volunteer Cavalry. He was appointed brigadier general of volunteers on June 12, 1862.

Like his uncles Brutus J. and Cassius M. Clay, Smith joined the Unionist Party. In 1862, he was elected as an Unconditional Unionist to the thirty-eighth congress, resigning from his military post on December 1, 1863. He served as chairman of the Committee on Militia from 1865 to 1866. He was brevetted major general of volunteers on March 13, 1865.

Governor
Smith resigned from Congress in July 1866 when President Andrew Johnson appointed him as Territorial Governor of Montana. He served there from 1866 to 1869, working to moderate hostilities between European American settlers and the Native Americans who occupied the lands, including tribes of the Blackfoot Confederacy.

Pastor
After he resigned, Smith returned to Washington, D.C. He was ordained to the Baptist ministry and served in a number of congregations while supporting the temperance movement. He was pastor in Richmond, Mt. Sterling, Frankfort and Louisville, Kentucky. In 1890 he was called as pastor of the Metropolitan Baptist Church (now Capitol Hill Baptist Church) in Washington, D.C., which he served until his death in 1895.

Presidential nomination
In 1876, the National Prohibition Party nominated Smith for President of the United States. With his running mate, Gideon T. Stewart, the two received 9,737 popular votes in the election. Smith continued his work in religion and temperance.

Death
Smith was interred in Arlington National Cemetery in Arlington, Virginia.

See also

List of American Civil War generals (Union)

References

External links
 Retrieved on 2008-08-17
Green Clay Smith at Arlington National Cemetery

1826 births
1895 deaths
People from Richmond, Kentucky
Baptist ministers from the United States
Unconditional Union Party members of the United States House of Representatives from Kentucky
Kentucky Unionists
Kentucky Prohibitionists
Governors of Montana Territory
Members of the Kentucky House of Representatives
Prohibition Party (United States) presidential nominees
Candidates in the 1876 United States presidential election
People of Kentucky in the American Civil War
Kentucky lawyers
Union Army generals
Green Clay family
American temperance activists
Transylvania University alumni
Burials at Arlington National Cemetery
19th-century American politicians
Baptists from Kentucky
Members of the United States House of Representatives from Kentucky